Camille Bryen, also known as Camille Briand, (September 17, 1907– August 5, 1977) was a French poet, painter and engraver.

Associated with the School of Paris, his work plays a part in the history of 
lyrical abstraction and tachisme.

Legacy 
In 1987 the French postal served issued a 5 Franc stamp that reproduced his work Précambrien.

Bryen was included in the exhibition L'envolée lyrique, Paris 1945–1956, presented by the Musée du Luxembourg, Paris in 2006.

Collections 
 Kunstmuseum Basel
 Musée Cantini
 Musée d'art et d'industrie de Saint-Étienne
 Musée du Frac Bretagne, Rennes
 Museum of Modern Art, New York

Bibliography 
 Daniel Abadie, Bryen Abhomme, La Connaissance, Brussels, 1973
 Jacques Audiberti, Bryen. L’ouvre-boîte, Gallimard, Paris, 1952
 Jacqueline Boutet-Loyer, Bryen, l’œuvre peint, Quatre Chemins, Paris, 1986
 Jacqueline Boutet-Loyer, La Dérive graphique de Camille Bryen, Galerie Callu Mérite, Paris, 1988
 Jacqueline Boutet-Loyer, Bryen et le défi de la peinture éternelle, Galerie Callu Merite, Paris, 1990
 Michel Butor, Bryen, en temps conjugués, Galerie de Seine, Paris, 1975
 Jean Clair, Propos d’un abhumaniste, interview, Chroniques de l’Art Vivant, Paris, 1971
 Georges Mathieu, Au-delà du tachisme, Paris, 1963
 Pierre Restany, Lyrisme et abstraction, Milan, 1960
 Michel Tapié, Un art autre, Paris, 1952
 Roger van Gindertael, Bryen, Galerie Raymonde Cazenave, Paris, 1960
 Marc Alyn, Camille Bryen, architecte de l'informel, Approches de l'art moderne, Bartillat, 2007
 Jacqueline Loyer, « Bryen », Nouvelles de l'estampe, 1975, catalog for engraved works

References

External links
 .

20th-century French poets
20th-century French painters
20th-century French engravers
20th-century French male artists
Artists from Nantes
Breton artists
Poets from Brittany
1907 births
1977 deaths
Writers from Nantes